The Piteå Wall of Fame is a wall of fame at Kvarnvallen Icestadium in the Swedish town of Piteå. Here, the players who started their career in an ice hockey club in Piteå and played in the Tre kronor are honored with a plate on the wall with a photo and career facts. Many of them are world champions, Olympic champions and Stanley Cup winners.

Players

See also
Swedish Hockey Hall of Fame

References
http://www.svenskafans.com/hockeyzon/pitea/artikel.asp?id=142707

Ice hockey museums and halls of fame
Swedish ice hockey trophies and awards
Museums in Norrbotten County
Wall
Halls of fame in Sweden